is a single leg takedown or "Ankle Pick" adopted later by the Kodokan into their Shinmeisho No Waza (newly accepted techniques) list. It is categorized as a hand technique, Te-waza.

Technique 
This technique involves tori reaching down toward the ukes legs and heel-picking the same side foot as the toris chosen hand. When done as the uke is stepping backwards, this is hard to defend.

Included Systems 
Systems:
Kodokan Judo, List of Kodokan Judo techniques
Lists:
The Canon Of Judo
Judo technique

Similar Techniques, Variants, and Aliases 
Aliases:
Heel trip (reversal)
Ankle Pick

External links
 Judoschool.org Collection of Kibisu Gaeshi Videos

Judo technique